Sindhu  is the Sanskrit name for the Indus River, a major river in Tibet, India and Pakistan.

Sindhu may also refer to:

People 
 Afzal Sindhu, Pakistani politician
 P. V. Sindhu (born 1995), Indian badminton player
 Sindhu Menon, Indian film actress
 Sindhu Tolani (born 1983), Indian film actress
 Sindhu Vee, Indian comedian
 Sindhu (actress) (1972–2005)

Other uses
Sindhu, an alternative spelling of Sandhu clan of Jats
Sindhu, a Chuhra sub-caste
 Sindhu (film), a 1975 Indian Malayalam film

See also 
 Indus (disambiguation)
 Sindhu Kingdom